(Johann Theodor) Paul Wendland (August 17, 1864 – September 10, 1915) was a German classical philologist.

Born in Hohenstein, Province of Prussia, he taught as a professor at the Kiel University (from 1902), Breslau University (from 1906), Göttingen University (from 1909).

He was co-author of an edition on Philo of Alexandria, "Philonis Alexandrini opera quae supersunt" (6 volumes, 1896-1915). With Otto Kern, he published "Beiträge zur Geschichte der griechischen Philosophie und Religion" (1895).

He died in Göttingen.

Literary works
 Philosophische Schrift über die Vorsehung, 1892 – Philosophical writings on divine providence.
 Beiträge zur Geschichte der grieschischen Philosophie, 1895 (with Otto Kern) – Contribution to the history of Greek philosophy.
 Anaximenes von Lampsakos, 1905 – Anaximenes of Lampsacus.
 Die hellenistisch-römische Kultur in ihren Beziehungen zu Judentum und Christentum, 1907 – Greco-Roman culture in its relations with Judaism and Christianity.
 Die urchristlichen Literaturformen, 1912 – Early Christian literature forms.
 Die griechische Prosa und die römisch-christliche Literatur, 1912 – Greek prose and Roman-Christian literature.
 Philonis Alexandrini opera quae supersunt, 6 volumes, (with Leopold Cohn), 1896-1915.

References

External links 
 WorldCat Identities Most widely held works by Paul Wendland.

1864 births
1915 deaths
People from Olsztynek
German philologists
People from the Province of Prussia
Academic staff of the University of Kiel
Academic staff of the University of Breslau
Academic staff of the University of Göttingen
Members of the Prussian Academy of Sciences